Cineyug Entertainment Private limited is a Mumbai-based premier entertainment company. The company was founded by Mohomed Morani Karim Morani, along with Aly Morani, Mazhar Nadiadwala  and late Bunty Soorma. Cineyug has recently tied up with The Walt Disney Company, in terms of live entertainment.

Films

References

External links
 
 
 
 
 

Film production companies based in Mumbai
Mass media companies established in 1997
1997 establishments in Maharashtra
Indian companies established in 1997